Merei is a commune in Buzău County, Muntenia, Romania. It is composed of eleven villages: Ciobănoaia, Dealul Viei, Dobrilești, Gura Sărății, Izvoru Dulce, Lipia, Merei, Nenciulești, Ogrăzile, Sărata-Monteoru and Valea Puțului.

Notes

Communes in Buzău County
Localities in Muntenia